Kurt Dillon (born 8 August 1994) is an Australian professional rugby league footballer who plays as a  for the Lézignan Sangliers in the Elite One Championship. 

He previously played for the Cronulla-Sutherland Sharks and South Sydney Rabbitohs in the National Rugby League (NRL).

Background
Dillon was born in Sydney, New South Wales, Australia. He was educated at Endeavour Sports High School, Caringbah and his junior club was De La Salle Caringbah.

Playing career

2017
Dillon won the Newtown Jets player of the year in 2017.

2018
He was named to make his Cronulla-Sutherland debut for their round 6 local derby match against the St George Illawarra Dragons. 
 On 5 September 2018, the South Sydney club announced the signing of Dillon for the 2019 and 2020 seasons.

Dillon played for Cronulla's feeder club side Newtown in the 2018 Intrust Super Premiership NSW grand final against Canterbury-Bankstown at Leichhardt Oval which Newtown lost 18-12.

2019
Dillon made no appearances for the South Sydney first grade team in 2019 but played for the club's reserve grade side in the Canterbury Cup NSW.  Dillon played in South Sydney's preliminary final defeat against Wentworthville.

2020
Dillon made his debut for South Sydney in round 15 of the 2020 NRL season against Manly-Warringah in which Souths won the match 56-16 at ANZ Stadium.

On 9 November, Dillon was released by South Sydney.

2021
In 2021, Dillon signed a contract to play for the Parramatta Eels NSW Cup team.

2022
In 2022, Dillon re-joined NSW Cup side Newtown.

References

External links

South Sydney Rabbitohs profile
Cronulla Sharks profile

1994 births
Living people
Australian rugby league players
Cronulla-Sutherland Sharks players
Lézignan Sangliers players
Newtown Jets NSW Cup players
Rugby league players from Sydney
Rugby league props
South Sydney Rabbitohs players